Kazakh Short U (Ұ ұ; italics: Ұ ұ) is a letter of the Cyrillic script. In Unicode, this letter is called "Straight U with stroke". Its form is  the Cyrillic letter Ue (Ү ү Ү ү) with a horizontal stroke through it. 

Kazakh Short U is used in the alphabet of the Kazakh language, where it represents the close back rounded vowel , or the near-close near-back rounded vowel . In other circumstances, it is used as a replacement for the former letter to represent close front rounded vowel  in situations where it would be easily confused with Cyrillic letter У у.

Unicode

See also
Ú ú : Latin letter Ú
У у : Cyrillic letter U
У́ у́ : Cyrillic letter U with acute
Ў ў : Cyrillic letter short U
Ү ү : Cyrillic letter Ue (straight U)
Cyrillic characters in Unicode
¥ (Japanese yen or  Chinese yuan)
Ɏ (Latin letter Y with stroke)

References

U